WXCM (97.1 FM, "97X") is an American radio station licensed to serve the community of Whitesville, Kentucky. The station is owned and operated by Hancock Communications, Inc., doing business as the Cromwell Radio Group.

WXCM broadcasts an Active Rock music format to the greater Owensboro, Kentucky, area. On January 4, 2010, the station began broadcasting the syndicated morning show "The Free Beer and Hot Wings Show" distributed by Compass Media Networks, but that show has since been discontinued due to low ratings.

The station was assigned the "WXCM" call letters by the Federal Communications Commission on June 9, 1997.

References

External links
100.5 The Vibe Facebook
WXCM 97x website

XCM
Active rock radio stations in the United States